He Yi-hang (31 July 1954 – 3 June 2019) was a Taiwanese television host and actor. He won two Golden Bell Awards, in 2006 and 2016.

In 2004, a group of people attacked He with baseball bats, causing severe injuries to his leg, arm and face. He was linked to patronage of a brothel in August 2010, and charged with drug possession after a subsequent investigation. Shortly thereafter, he posted bail and was released from prison. He later reported to the Shilin Administrative Enforcement Agency and was questioned about tax evasion. On 3 June 2019, he died of colorectal cancer at Taipei Veterans General Hospital.

Awards 
 Golden Bell Awards – Best Host in a Variety Show (Musical Variety) (2006, Gold Nightclub) 
 Golden Bell Awards – Best Supporting Actor in a TV Series (2016, Baby Daddy)

References

External links

1956 births
2019 deaths
Taiwanese male television actors
Taiwanese television presenters
21st-century Taiwanese male actors
Deaths from cancer in Taiwan
Deaths from colorectal cancer